Daryl Bennett is a musician and film score composer whose music has been heard on films such as Voyage of the Unicorn, Wishmaster: The Prophecy Fulfilled,  Entrance, and television shows such as The Outer Limits, and Higher Ground. As a drummer, one of the artists he has recorded with is Long John Baldry on his It Still Ain't Easy album. He is the father of Eli Bennett, an award winning jazz saxophonist.

Background
He introduced his son Eli to music when Eli was twelve years old. Eli, who was the first born son used to make his bed in his father's studio. His son received the CBC Galaxie Award at the National Jazz Awards in Toronto around 2009.

Film career
One  of his earliest projects in soundtrack work was in the Roger Larry directed film Knocking on Heaven's Door which was released around 1994.
He had multiple roles in the 2006 horror film. One as an actor in The Entrance, playing the Priest. He was also associate producer, film editor, and music composer.<ref>Dvd Talk [http://www.dvdtalk.com/dvdsavant/s2746lee.html The Entrance and The Passage Separate releases reviewed by Lee Broughton]</ref>Rotten Tomatoes Daryl Bennett

Documentaries
He worked as composer and editor on the 2013 documentary film The Exhibition with Damon Vignale, and Miho Yamamoto. It received the Michael Sullivan Frontline Award for Journalism in a Documentary Film at the 2014 Salem Film Festival. For his work on The Exhibition, he received the Seattle Composers Alliance award as 2014 Winner of the Best Original Score. Along with son Eli, he provided the music for the film Human Harvest which features Nobel Peace Prize nominees David Matas and David Kilgour.

Musician and producer

Musician
One of the bands he was a member of was The Philippe Lapointe Group which recorded the album, Natural Selection, released in 1987. Another group he was in was the Powder Blues Band which was formed in the late 1970s.Canadian Classic Rock Powder Blues As of 2011, he was still a member of the group.

Production and composition
Along with Jim Guttridge, he had a role in composing "Bethlehem (The World Is Gonna Hear About You)" which Andraé Crouch sung on his The Gift Of Christmas album, released in 1998.
One of the artists he has produced for is Canadian violinist Rosemary Siemens on her Once Upon a Dream album she recorded with Roy Tan.

Discography
 Connie Scott  – Hold On - Image 7 ICD 7818 - 1987 - (Percussion)
 The Philippe Lapointe Group - Natural Selection -  Progress Records PR001 - 1987 - (Drums)
 Hope Sterling  – The Way Things Are - Image 7 ICD 7826 - (Drums, percussion) 
 Connie Scott - Christmas In Your Heart - Image 7 ICD 7828 - 1988 - (Drums, percussion)
 Bob Hanson  – '''Nuff Said - Lorotz LZ3090CD - 1990 - (Percussion), (Drums on "'Nuff Said")
 Andraé Crouch  – The Gift Of Christmas - Qwest Records  9 47091-2, Warner Bros. Records  9 47091-2 - 1999(Arranger, music composer, Synthesizer programing on "Bethlehem (The World Is Gonna Hear About You)"
 Amos Garrett - Make My Home in My Shoes - Stony Plain 1132 - 1988/1991/1995 - (Drums)
 Long John Baldry - It Still Ain't Easy - Stony Plain Records SPCD 1163 - 1991 - (Drums)
 Harriet Frost – Twilight Conversations - Lost Horizon (EP) - 1993 - (Drums, percussion)
 Hal Beckett - Natural Places - Marquis Records 5170 - 1995 (Drums, Percussion)  
 Harriet Frost  – Random Days - Lost Horizon LHP02 - 2009 - (Drums, percussion)

Films (selective)

References

External links
 
 Website

Canadian session musicians
Canadian drummers
Canadian rock drummers
Canadian jazz drummers
Canadian film producers